Vatle is a surname. Notable people with the surname include:

Arvid Vatle (born 1938), Norwegian physician
Sylvelin Vatle (born 1957), Norwegian writer

See also
Vale (surname)